Bade Dilwala (English translation - Big Hearted) is a 1983 Hindi-language action crime drama film directed by Bhappi Sonie and starring Rishi Kapoor, Tina Munim, Pran, Aruna Irani, Madan Puri, Amjad Khan, Jagdeep and Sarika. The movie was a remake of Kati Patang with a gender change.

Plot
Widower businessman Mr. Sinha lives a very wealthy lifestyle along with two daughters, Juhi and Rashmi. Both are of marriageable age and he wants them to marry within equally wealthy families. Juhi ends up falling in love with a middle-classed young man named Vijay Kumar Gupta much to the chagrin of Sinha, who refuses to bless the couple, compelling them to elope. Years later Vijay and Juhi become parents to a young boy, Munna, Sinha forgives them and asks them to return home. The train they were traveling in meets with an accident and amongst the survivors are Vijay and his son. A grieving Sinha welcomes Munna and Vijay, treats Vijay as his son, lets him run the business as well as decides to make him the heir to his wealth and estate. When Reshmi returns home, she is apprehensive of Vijay, at first, then falls in love with him. A man named Dr. Joshi brings an amnesiac Juhi home. He knows a dark secret about Vijay, that he is an ex-convict, jailed for Theft, and is now on the run from the Police for murder.

Cast
 Rishi Kapoor ... Amrit Kumar Saxena / Vijay Kumar Gupta 
 Tina Munim ... Rashmi Sinha
 Pran ... Mr. Sinha
 Aruna Irani ... Shabnam 
 Madan Puri ... Makhanlal 
 Amjad Khan ... Bhagwat Singh / Dr. Joshi
 Jagdeep ... Jagannath Prasad Shrivastav "Jaggu"
 Dhumal ... Banwarilal
 Bharat Bhushan ... Doctor
 Vijay Arora ... Vijay Kumar Gupta 
 Sarika ... Juhi Sinha
 Roopesh Kumar ... Prem
 Bhushan Tiwari ... Shambhu
 Shivraj ... Vasil-Ul-Hassan Khan
 Kalpana Iyer ... Luska/Kaajal
 Jyoti Bakshi ... Tara J. Shrivastava
 Jankidas ... Dr. Jamunadas
 Madhu Malhotra ... Ms. Malhotra
 Praveen Paul ... Kamla Shrivastava
 Habib ... Gypsy dance show arranger
 Raj Rani ... Mrs.Khan
 Babloo ... Munna, Vijay & Juhi's son
 Dilip Dhawan ... Dr.Ali Khan

Soundtrack

The songs were written by Majrooh Sultanpuri and  the track "Kahin Na Jaa Aaj Kahin Mat Jaa" is a copy of the 1945 song La Vie en rose.

Trivia 
Pran's character is shown owning a beverage manufacturing plant 'Dipy's' which was a famous brand in 80's selling orange and lime juice, jams etc.

References

External links 
 
 Dipy's 

1983 films
1980s Hindi-language films
Films scored by R. D. Burman
Films directed by Bhappi Sonie